Arthur Mitchell, often referred to as the "Trinity Killer," is a fictional character and the main antagonist of the fourth season of the Showtime TV series Dexter; he is portrayed by actor John Lithgow as an unassuming church deacon and family man—who for 30 years has been living a double life as a serial killer. In the series, FBI agent Frank Lundy (Keith Carradine) dubs him the "Trinity Killer" because of a recurring pattern of three killings based on traumatic events during Arthur's childhood.

Lithgow's performance of Mitchell received universal acclaim, with Lithgow winning a Golden Globe Award and a Primetime Emmy Award for his performance. In 2016, Rolling Stone ranked him #34 of their "40 Greatest TV Villains of All Time". IGN ranked him #57 of the "Top 100 Villains".

Victims 

Arthur was a suburbanite who lived a double life as one of America's most prolific serial killers for three decades. He was originally thought by the FBI to be a mere "myth" chased by Special Agent Frank Lundy.

Mitchell's first murder was a young woman whom he killed inside a bathtub. She was sliced with a straight razor while putting her in a choke hold, and holding up a small mirror so that he can see her face as she dies. His second victim is a married mother of two, whom he kidnapped. He forced her, by threatening her husband and children if she does not comply with him, to fall from high above a carefully selected abandoned building to her death. His third victim is a father of two, whom he bludgeons to death with a hammer. At each site, he places a small sample of his sister's ashes and arranged the victim's arm to point at the ash. He has repeated this cycle in different cities all over the United States.

It is later discovered before these incidents Mitchell also kidnaps a young boy whom he dresses in cowboy pajamas and convinces to play with a train set in a recreation of his childhood. Following this, he will bury the boy alive in cement at a Four Walls building site. These killings were not connected to the pattern until shortly before Mitchell's death, because the boys were reported as missing rather than dead.

Mitchell has a family, including his wife Sally (Julia Campbell), and their teenage children, Jonah (Brando Eaton) and Rebecca (Vanessa Marano). He also has another, older daughter from a previous relationship: Christine Hill (Courtney Ford). At first, Dexter Morgan (Michael C. Hall) is fascinated by Mitchell's efficient killing methods and apparent ability to balance his familial responsibilities with his secret life as a serial killer. However, Mitchell is later revealed to be secretly abusive toward his family.

Development 

Mitchell was created by executive producer Clyde Phillips for the fourth season of Dexter. He is portrayed by actor John Lithgow, a prolific actor in stage and screen.

Fictional biography

Backstory 

When Mitchell was ten, he spied on his older sister Vera taking a shower; when she saw him, she was so startled that she slipped and fell through the glass door, slicing her femoral artery and bleeding to death. His parents blamed him for Vera's death. His mother committed suicide two years later by jumping out of a window. His father, already a heavy drinker, became an alcoholic and frequently beat his son during his drunken rages. Ultimately, his father was bludgeoned to death with a hammerit is suggested by Mitchell himself. Mitchell re-enacts the death of his family in his murders: the young woman represents his sister, the married mother of two represents his mother, the father of two represents his father, and the boy represents Mitchell himself.

Episode 37 

Mitchell begins the cycle again, killing his victims at the original murder sites. Mitchell punishes himself after each murder: after killing the woman in the bathtub, he takes a shower in scalding hot water; after forcing a mother to fall to her death, he provokes a drunken man into beating him up.

Episode 40 

FBI agent Frank Lundy comes out of retirement to hunt Trinity down but is shot and killed just as he begins to close in on him. Lundy had theorized that Trinity was a loner who had no life outside killing. When Dexter goes to kill Trinity, he discovers that Trinity is a husband and father, as well as a prominent figure in a charitable Christian homebuilding organization. He uses this organization to travel around the country to cover for his murder spree, and (it is later learned) as a dump site for the first victim in each cycle.

Episode 43 

Dexter is conflicted over whether to kill Mitchell or learn how he makes his family life work. Dexter, under the alias of Kyle Butler, befriends Mitchell and soon learns that, unlike Dexter, Mitchell has no problem being himself with his family or expressing affection. He also witnesses Mitchell's strange, unpredictable personality; the same man who murders people with uncommon brutality starts crying when he and Dexter hit a deer, and is appalled at the idea of putting it out of its misery.

Episode 44 

As Mitchell plans a trip to Tampa to build a house, Dexter concocts a plan to go to a meteorological convention to establish an alibi so he has a reason to be in Tampa as well. Mitchell reluctantly allows Dexter to tag along when Dexter claims he's done something terrible that only Mitchell can help him recover from. Dexter, hoping to redeem his murder of an innocent man, plans to murder the decidedly guilty Mitchell along the way. During their road trip, however, Mitchell pushes Dexter to admit his terrible deed, and Dexter claims to have killed someone in a hunting accident. This admission greatly affects Mitchell, who sees it as a sign of kinship. He takes Dexter to his old home and tells him that when he was ten years old that he startled his sister while spying on her in the shower; she fell and broke the glass door, slicing her femoral artery and bleeding to death. His mother later committed suicide by leaping off a building, leaving him in the care of his abusive father; Dexter conjectures that Mitchell bludgeoned his father to death, accounting for the third victim.

For the remainder of the trip, Mitchell exhibits sudden mood swings and irrational behavior. He keeps telling random people about his family members' deaths and stresses the need for confession, to the point that Dexter is worried that Mitchell might tell people about Dexter's previously mentioned murder. One morning, Dexter sneaks into Mitchell's room, intent on killing him, only to find him gone. Dexter tracks him to a construction site where Mitchell attempts suicide. Dexter reluctantly stops him, wanting to kill Mitchell himself. Dexter contemplates letting Mitchell fall to his death, but as he is about to let go, workers at the site come to help Dexter save him. Afterward, Mitchell has a newfound zest for life, believing God sent Dexter to save him.

Episode 45 

As Dexter gets to know Mitchell, he learns that his would-be mentor is not the loving family man he appears to be; Mitchell dominates his wife, beats his son, and keeps his daughter virtually imprisoned in her room. During Thanksgiving, Mitchell's son, Jonah, lashes out at his father, destroying his homebuilder's plaques and smashing his sister's urn. In a fit of rage, Mitchell almost strangles Jonah, but Dexter interferes, dragging him into the kitchen. Just as Dexter has Mitchell at his mercy, however, Mitchell's wife and daughter rush in to stop him.

Episodes 46 and 47 

Dexter witnesses Mitchell kidnap a child but is unable to stop him. Eventually Dexter tracks him down as he's about to bury the boy alive in drying concrete. Dexter saves the boy, but Mitchell escapes. After Mitchell learns from a news report that the boy is alive and that Dexter didn't turn him in, he begins to become suspicious. As he tries to find Dexter he kills a man named Kyle Butler, and ultimately follows Dexter to the Miami Metro Police Department. There, he discovers Dexter's real name.

Episode 48 

In the last episode of the season, "The Getaway", Dexter subdues Mitchell and prepares to kill him in the room where Mitchell had held the kidnapped child. Mitchell believes Dexter was sent by God to kill him and claims that he had tried several times to stop killing, but found that he could not change his "path". He predicts a similar fate for Dexter: he tells Dexter "It's already over", the same thing he says to his victims before he kills them. Dexter kills him with a hammer. It is revealed in the final scene of the episode that Mitchell had killed Dexter's wife, Rita (Julie Benz), beforehand, in the bathtub of Dexter's house, and that he left Dexter's son Harrison in her blood, mirroring the childhood trauma that put Dexter on the path to becoming a serial killer.

Episode 52 

Miami Metro detective Joey Quinn suspects Dexter of killing Rita, and he connects the dots as to the identity of Kyle Butler. Anxious to further his investigation, Quinn requests permission from Captain Maria LaGuerta, but she denies his request and orders him to leave Dexter alone. Undeterred, Quinn finds Jonah Mitchell amidst being relocated into witness protection with the rest of his family, and tries to show him a picture of Dexter so that Jonah can confirm whether or not it is "Kyle Butler". However, one of the FBI convoys manages to intercept Quinn's attempt before he succeeds, so Quinn's query remains unanswered.

Episode 67 

In the sixth season, Dexter hears news about the Mitchell family, who are now living in Nebraska: Mitchell's wife, Sally, and daughter, Rebecca, have been murdered in the same way as Mitchell's victims. Dexter deduces that Jonah is the killer, and hunts him down. At first, Jonah claims his father killed them both but later gets into a fight with Dexter, seemingly wanting to die by Dexter's hand. Confused, Dexter gets Jonah to confess that Rebecca committed suicide because their mother kept blaming the children for Mitchell's capture; upon finding her, Jonah flew into a fit of rage and killed his mother, bludgeoning her in the same manner that his father killed his victims. Dexter tells Jonah to forgive himself and leaves.

Dexter: New Blood 

Mitchell's actionsparticularly murdering Ritainfluence the plot of the 20212022 limited series Dexter: New Blood, set ten years after the end of the original series and roughly thirteen years after Mitchell's death. Harrison (Jack Alcott), now a teenager, finds out the truth about his mother's death from a true crime podcast, and begins to remember witnessing his mother's murder. He is particularly disturbed by a memory of Mitchell smiling at him and saying, "Don't worry, Daddy will be home soon." It is implied that seeing his mother's murder traumatized Harrison so badly that he developed homicidal urges such as Dexter's.

References

Dexter (series) characters
Fictional murderers of children
Fictional serial killers
Fictional domestic abusers
Fictional schoolteachers
Fictional kidnappers
Television characters introduced in 2009
Fictional clergy
Fictional child abusers
Fictional patricides
American male characters in television
Fictional attempted suicides
Male villains
Fictional murdered people
Male characters in television
Fictional victims of domestic abuse